Mykola Ivanovych Pinchuk (born 25 July 1946 in Tikhoretsk) is a retired Ukrainian and Soviet football player.

Honours
Zorya Luhansk
 Soviet Top League winner: 1972.
SC Chernigov
 Cup of the Ukrainian SSR winner 1976.

International career
Pinchuk played his only game for USSR on 29 June 1972 in a friendly against Uruguay.

References
  Profile

1946 births
Living people
People from Tikhoretsk
Soviet footballers
Soviet Union international footballers
Ukrainian footballers
Russian emigrants to Ukraine
FC Zorya Luhansk players
FC CSKA Kyiv players
Soviet Top League players
Association football defenders